Boris Alberto Cabrera (born December 16, 1980, in Inglewood, California), is an American former actor. Cabrera is primarily known as originating the role of Marco in the live-adaptation television series of the long-running book series Animorphs. He left the entertainment industry in the early 2000s and became a personal fitness trainer. He also attended Morningside High School in Inglewood, California.

Filmography

References

External links

1980 births
Living people
Male actors from Inglewood, California
Morningside High School alumni
American male television actors
Hispanic and Latino American male actors